Joseph Alan Bock  (born July 21, 1959 in Rochester, New York, USA) is a former American professional football player.

He attended East Rochester High School and played college football at the University of Virginia from 1977 to 1981. He was a defensive lineman and long snapper. His nickname is William.

Professional football career
Joseph Alan Bock's professional career was from 1981–1988 and Joe also played in 2006 for the Rochester Raiders and the New York/New Jersey Revolution of the Great Lakes Indoor Football League at the age of 46. Joe played for the Buffalo Bills in 1981 and 1987, the Birmingham Stallions of the USFL in 1983 and 1985, the Houston Gamblers in 1984, and the St. Louis Cardinals in 1987. In 1988, Joseph Alan Bock played in the Arena Football League for the Chicago Bruisers and appeared in ArenaBowl II.

Sources
databaseFootball.com – Joe Bock
Joe Bock Statistics – Pro-Football-reference.com
AFL Players
Houston Gamblers
arenafan.com

Buffalo Bills players
Houston Gamblers players
Birmingham Stallions players
St. Louis Cardinals (football) players
Chicago Bruisers players
Players of American football from New York (state)
1959 births
Living people
Sportspeople from Rochester, New York
National Football League replacement players